Tancheng County is a county under the administration of the prefecture-level city of Linyi, in Shandong Province, People's Republic of China.

Tancheng is the southernmost county-level division of Shandong Province and borders Jiangsu. It is about 90 kilometres (by road) south of Linyi City, and almost 300 kilometers south by southeast of Jinan, the capital city of Shandong Province. Qing Dao on the coast is 250 km. NE of Tancheng. Just over into Jiangsu is Xinyi. Tancheng  is the “Hometown of Chinese Ginkgo” and “Hometown of Chinese Tamarix”.

The population in 2011 was 970,000. The land area of the county is about 1,306.58 square kilometres. It is a developing city in a rural area. Tancheng is famous for its ginkgo trees.

Administrative divisions
As 2012, this county is divided to 11 towns and 6 townships.
Towns

Townships

Climate

Historical events

Visit by Confucius
A visit by Confucius to Tancheng had been kept alive in local memory. A temple and shrines marked the locations where Confucius was said to have been seen. The episode is described in the ancient Tso-chuan commentary on the Spring and Autumn Annals, a classic text of China. It apparently tells of the journey by Confucius circa 524 B.C. from his home in Lu to the former state of T'an, to consult and study with the Viscount of T'an, also called T'an-tzu. Qufu was capital of Lu. Tancheng claims being then the capital of T'an.

6th century poet
Xu Ling was born in Tancheng county. His reputation as a poet was established in his youth. Later at the court of the Liang dynasty in south China, he compiled the anthology New Songs from the Jade Terrace.

17th century life
Tancheng in the 17th century is the setting for Jonathan Spence's multi-layered microhistory. It contains an idiosyncratic narrative, many social vignettes, and several criminal cases: The Death of Woman Wang (1978).

Local writings
Spence draws on three sources for Tancheng. The first two authors, also magistrates, came to Tancheng from other provinces and are described below. The third and most well known is from nearby Tancheng.
 Local History of T'an-ch'eng (1673), edited by Feng K'o-st'an. 
 A complete Book concerning Happiness and Benevolence, which Spence describes as "a personal memoir and handbook on the office of magistrate compiled in the 1690s by the scholar-official Huang Liu-hung". 
 Strange Stories written in the Liao studio by P'u Sung-ling (1640-1715). These are sad and true stories and contrarian essays of the time and place. The author P'u "lived a little to the north in Tzu-ch'uan county, separated from T'an-ch'eng by a range of bandit-infested hills".

Two magistrates
Feng
In 1668 Feng K'o-st'an arrived in Tancheng from Fukien as the new magistrate. This was the year of the Great Tancheng earthquake. Its calamitous effects greatly complicated the situation he faced.

Although Feng was a "chin-shih", an 'advanced scholar', his experiences in Tancheng were not fortunate. He was dismissed from office in 1670. His Local History took a long view of Tancheng, recording that it was "suffering for fifty years" from the 1622 White Lotus uprisings, which arose during times of drought, locusts, famine, sickness, and assorted banditry. People hurt, and despaired. In 1643 "Manchu troops under General Abatai" invaded Tancheng and "killed tens of thousands". In 1644 the Ming dynasty collapsed.

Huang
In 1670 the scholar Huang Liu-hung arrived in Tancheng as the next magistrate. From Honan, it was his first posting. The people of Tancheng told him that the region had for many years been "destitute and ravaged". He found the people struggling for bare survival. They were also "unusually superstitious". It was very difficult to raise moral. The social fabric had begun to fray. To counter the "decades of catastrophes", Huang attempted to grant generous "tax concessions" and "corvée labor rebates", but adequate approval by the Peking government was not forthcoming. Huang's duties were various, including criminal trials (see below).

1668 earthquake

The Great Tancheng Earthquake (pinyin: Tánchéng dìzhèn) is also known as the 1668 Shandong earthquake. At an estimated magnitude M8.5, probably it was the largest seismic event ever recorded for eastern China. The epicenter is thought to have been northeast of Linyi city.

P'u wrote about the quake. He and his cousin were drinking wine in lamp light, when the roar came at them. The table rocked, spilled the wine. Roof beams and pillars "began to snap". Houses would "collapse and, as it were, rise up again". The "screams of men and women" they heard; the din of dogs and roosters. An hour later came a calm. Excited people in the streets at night, half dressed, shared earthquake stories.

1672 murder trial
A day-laborer Jen and his father filed a complaint at the Yamen in Tan-ch'eng. They alleged their neighbor Kao killed Jen's wife the woman Wang, while in an adulterous affair. The case came before Magistrate Huang Liu-hung (see above). Kao and his wife were put in the grim city prison. Thus ended day one of proceedings.

Day two Jen testified that he awoke at night to see Kao with a knife lead his wife away. He followed them to Kao's house where Kao's wife awaited. Afraid, Jen left. Kao denied the adultery and murder. His wife Ts'ao offered an alibi per the village night watchmen. Huang released Kao and Ts'ao, and imprisoned Jen and his father.

Huang rode out to the village on day three. At Jen's house, he saw extreme poverty. Also found was dried human excrement by the bed. A woman examined the body of woman Wang, finding on her neck massive bruises. The watchmen confirmed Ts'ao's alibi. Back in Tan-ch'eng Huang put Jen and his father inside the City God's temple that night. There Jen said that "it was he, Jen, who deserved to die."

On day four Jen confessed. Thus his father had falsely accused the innocent, a serious crime. Finding mitigation, Huang let him go. Jen was sentenced to a potentially fatal beating and to wearing the cangue around his neck. The woman Wang, it was feared, might haunt the village as a hungry ghost. Burial in a good coffin near her home may pacify her spirit, Huang felt.

References

Counties of Shandong
Linyi